XHMTM-FM is a radio station on 91.3 FM in Montemorelos, Nuevo León. The station is owned by José Armando de la Cruz Rodríguez and carries a Spanish-language Christian format under the name Radio Libertad.

History
Armando de la Cruz filed for a social station in Montemorelos on March 6, 2014. Five years to the day, on March 6, 2019, the Federal Telecommunications Institute in comparative hearing selected the application over a competing bid for the frequency from Fundación Cultural para la Sociedad Mexicana, A.C. de la Cruz's existing Christian pirate station, Radio Libertad, moved from 88.3 to the legal 91.3 on August 5, 2019.

References

Radio stations in Nuevo León
Christian radio stations in Mexico